"Back to Love" is a single released by Italian-American television personality and disc jockey DJ Pauly D, featuring vocals from British singer Jay Sean. It was released as a Digital download in the United Kingdom on January 15, 2013. The song has peaked to number 113 on the UK Singles Chart and number 22 on the UK Dance Chart.

Live performances
In January 2013, DJ Pauly D and Jay Sean performed the song live on The Ellen DeGeneres Show. On June 16, 2013, DJ Pauly D performed the song live on Miss USA 2013 competition.

Music video
The music video for Back To Love was released on March 19, 2013. The video features both Jay Sean and Pauly D throughout.

Lyric video
A lyric music video to accompany the release of "Back to Love" was first released onto YouTube on January 15, 2013 at a total length of three minutes and fifty-four seconds.

Track listing

Charts

Weekly charts

Year-end charts

Release history

References

2013 singles
DJ Pauly D songs
2013 songs
Songs written by Jared Cotter
Songs written by Khaled Rohaim